The Palmer-Perkins House is a historic home in Monticello, Florida. It is located at 625 West Palmer Mill Road. On July 10, 1979, it was added to the U.S. National Register of Historic Places.

On March 18, 1986, there was a boundary increase to this site, also referred to as the Palmer-Perkins House and Palmer Family Graveyard. It extended the listing to 185 West Washington Street.

References

Gallery

Houses on the National Register of Historic Places in Florida
National Register of Historic Places in Jefferson County, Florida
Houses in Jefferson County, Florida
Monticello, Florida
1836 establishments in Florida Territory